The International Association of Theatre Critics (IATC) is a non-profit non-government organization that is an arm of United Nations Educational, Scientific and Cultural Organization. Founded in Paris in 1956, the organization's purpose is to encourage and promote theatre criticism, protect the interests of critics, and enhance comprehension between cultures. The IATC holds bi-annual young critics' seminars and an international convention of professional critics every two years. Additionally, the organization periodically offers symposiums, and other international events. The organization membership is largely made up of a little over 50 national critics groups, such as the American Theatre Critics Association and the Critics Circle of London. Individuals may also join who are in a country without a national organization. Historically the organization has served as mediator between adversarial critics' groups (such as critics outside of government arts ministries being at odds with those inside those ministries), and as a means for critics divided by political barriers to congregate (such as United States and Russian critics meeting during the Cold War).

References

External links
Official Website

Theatre critics
International cultural organizations
UNESCO
Organizations established in 1956
Organizations based in Paris
1956 establishments in France
1956 in theatre